Bekhud Dehlvi (21 March 1863 – 2 October 1955), born Syed Wahid-ud-Din Ahmed, was the son of Syed Shams-ud-Din "Salim", also an Urdu language poet. Bekhud was born at Bharatpur, which is now in Rajasthan. He was brought to Delhi by Altaf Hussain Hali who in 1891 made Bekhud became a disciple of Daagh Dehlvi and soon rose in prominence. His collection of Urdu ghazals – Guftar e Bekhud and Shahsavaar e Bekhud, were published during his lifetime. He died on 2 October 1955 in Delhi at the age of 92 years.

References

Urdu-language poets from India
Muslim poets
20th-century Indian Muslims
Indian male poets
1860s births
1955 deaths
20th-century Indian poets
20th-century Indian male writers
Poets in British India